Nina Borisovna Pirogova (born 26 January 1999) is a Russian ice hockey player and member of the Russian national team. She currently serves as an alternate captain of HC Tornado in the Zhenskaya Hockey League (ZhHL).

Pirogova represented Russia at the IIHF Women's World Championships in 2015, 2016, 2017, 2019, and 2021, winning a bronze medal at the 2016 tournament, and at the Winter Universiades in 2017 and 2019, winning gold medals at both tournaments. She participated in the women's ice hockey tournament at the 2018 Winter Olympics with the Olympic Athletes from Russia team. As a member of the Russian national under-18 team, she participated in four IIHF Women's U18 World Championships during 2014 to 2017, winning bronze medals at the 2015 and 2016 tournaments and serving as captain for the 2017 tournament.

At age 14, she made her debut in the Russian Championship league with HC Tornado and has remained with the team throughout the entirety of her club career, from the 2013–14 RWHL season to present.

References

External links
 
 

1999 births
Living people
Russian women's ice hockey defencemen
People from Stupinsky District
HC Tornado players
Ice hockey players at the 2018 Winter Olympics
Ice hockey players at the 2022 Winter Olympics
Olympic ice hockey players of Russia
Universiade gold medalists for Russia
Universiade medalists in ice hockey
Competitors at the 2017 Winter Universiade
Competitors at the 2019 Winter Universiade
Sportspeople from Moscow Oblast